Peter Doohan and Laurie Warder won the title, defeating Marty Davis and Tim Pawsat 2–6, 6–4, 7–5 in the final.

Seeds

  Peter Doohan /  Laurie Warder (champions)
  Jeremy Bates /  Kelly Evernden (first round)
  Marty Davis /  Tim Pawsat (final)
  Kelly Jones /  Gary Muller (semifinals)

Draw

Draw

External links
 Draw

Doubles